The 2019 Uttarakhand Panchayat general elections were held in the Indian state of Uttarakhand on in three phases on 5, 11, and 16 October 2019.

Previously, in the same year on 14 June 2019, the Uttarakhand State Election Commission also announced the poll dates for the municipal councils of Srinagar and Bajpur on 8 July 2019 and the results were declared on 10 July 2019.

Additionally, the Uttarakhand State Election Commission announced the poll date for Roorkee Municipal Corporation on 22 November 2019 and results were declared on 24 November 2019.

Timeline

Results

Municipal Corporation Mayoral result

Municipal Council Chairpersons results

Municipal election results

Panchayat general election results

See also
 2019 Roorkee Municipal Corporation election
 2019 elections in India
 2023 Uttarakhand urban local body elections

References

External links

External links
State Election Commission

Local elections in Uttarakhand
2019 elections in India